Andrien is a surname. Notable people with the surname include:

Jean-Jacques Andrien (born 1944), Belgian film director
Martin-Joseph Andrien (1766–1822), French operatic bass

See also
 Adrien
 Andrian (name)
 Andries
 Andraux